La Mesa Boulevard station is a station on the Orange Line of the San Diego Trolley located in the San Diego suburb of La Mesa, California. It serves the dense nearby commercial area, as well as a variety of apartment buildings that surround the stop.

Adjacent to the station is the historic La Mesa Depot Museum owned by the Pacific Southwest Railway Museum. The museum is a restored station from 1894, and has original equipment from that era including a Steam locomotive and Caboose. The station building  was built in 1894, when the San Diego and Cuyamaca Railway had built it, and moved across the tracks to its current site in 1915. Passenger service stopped in 1928, and did not restart until 1989 as part of the San Diego Trolley.

History
The line was extended to its current terminus in 1995.

This station was renovated from June 2012 through fall 2012 as part of the Trolley Renewal Project, although the station remained open during construction.

Station layout
There are two tracks, each served by a side platform.

See also
 List of San Diego Trolley stations

References

External links
La Mesa Depot Museum

Orange Line (San Diego Trolley)
San Diego Trolley stations
La Mesa, California
1989 establishments in California
Railway stations in the United States opened in 1989